The Railroad to Freedom: A Story of the Civil War is a children's book by Hildegarde Swift. It is a fictionalized biography of Araminta Ross (later known as Harriet Tubman) telling of her life in slavery and her work on the Underground Railroad.  The book, illustrated by James Daugherty, was first published in 1932 and was a Newbery Honor recipient in 1933.

References

 

1932 children's books
American children's books
American biographies
Newbery Honor-winning works
Works about the Underground Railroad
Non-fiction books about American slavery
Biographies about African-American people
Children's history books
Cultural depictions of Harriet Tubman